Wo Fat (Chinese: 禾发) is the name of a fictional villain in the CBS series Hawaii Five-O. On the show, Wo Fat is the nemesis of Steve McGarrett (Jack Lord and Alex O'Loughlin), the head of Hawaii's (fictional) special task force, Five-O.

The character appeared in eleven episodes of the original Hawaii Five-O, including the TV-movie pilot and the final episode. Two of his appearances were in two-part episodes and three were two-hour specials later re-edited into two-parters for reruns. The character evolved from the beginning as a master spy for China, later into an extremist Chinese agent working with a hawkish Chinese general. The general opposed peace discussions with the United States in the early 1970s. By the end of the series, Wo Fat had become an international super-criminal out for his own interests. In the last episode, Wo Fat is finally arrested and jailed after 12 years as a wanted criminal. However, in the final shot, he smiles and craftily produces a file hidden in his shoe. It remains a perpetual cliffhanger.

In the original show, Wo Fat was portrayed by Khigh Dhiegh (born Kenneth Dickerson) who, despite looking sufficiently Asian for the role, was actually of mixed English, Egyptian, and Sudanese ancestry. Actor and martial artist Mark Dacascos, who had Irish, Spanish Filipino, Japanese, and Chinese ancestry, portrayed the character in the 2010 Hawaii Five-0 reboot.

Name origin

Leonard Freeman, the producer of the series, took the name for the character from the now-defunct Wo Fat restaurant in Honolulu's Chinatown. The Wo Fat Building is in the Chinatown Historic District, which is listed on the National Register of Historic Places.

Original show: Hawaii Five-O (1968–1980)

Evolution of Wo Fat's role with the Chinese government
In the first four years of the show's existence, Wo Fat made nine appearances.  In Hawaii Five-O: Cocoon (September 20, 1968), the series pilot, Wo Fat, as a Chinese spy, uses sensory deprivation to crack the most loyal U.S. intelligence agents to give up top secret information. He was absent from the show for a year, but then made eight appearances over the three-year period from October 1969 to October 1972. In these appearances, Wo Fat continues his position as a top Chinese intelligence agent in the Pacific, whose duties include running Chinese spy missions in Hawaii. Wo Fat's appearances during this period are: "Forty Feet High and It Kills!" (October 8, 1969), "A Bullet for McGarrett" (October 29, 1969), "And a Time to Die..." (September 16, 1970), "F.O.B. Honolulu: Part 1" (January 27, 1971), "F.O.B. Honolulu: Part 2" (February 3, 1971), "The Ninety-Second War: Part 1" (January 18, 1972), "The Ninety-Second War: Part 2" (January 25, 1972), and "The Jinn Who Clears the Way" (October 10, 1972),

There was a two-year gap before Wo Fat turned up again, by which time his circumstances had changed. In the episode titled "Presenting... in the Center Ring... Murder" (December 10, 1974), Wo Fat is working for a hawkish government faction in China, and attempts to assassinate the Chinese foreign minister, who represents the more peace-oriented leadership in China at the time.

A year later, In "Murder—Eyes Only" (September 12, 1975), Wo Fat returns to his more traditional role as an intelligence operative attempting to obtain the coordinates for a downed American military satellite in the Pacific through a mole in U.S. Naval Intelligence.

However, a year after that, in "Nine Dragons" (September 30, 1976), Wo Fat is depicted as the head of the Chinese mafia, who is attempting to cause a conflict between the U.S. and China through a mass killing in China from American-developed nerve gas, stolen from Hawaii, which would allow him to regain power in the Chinese government.

Wo Fat was then not seen for nearly four years. In his final appearance and the series finale ("Woe to Wo Fat" (April 5, 1980)), Wo Fat is presented as completely unaffiliated with the Chinese government, operating on a remote island, developing a solar weapon for the highest bidder.

The evolution of Wo Fat's role with regard to the Chinese government is presumably due to President Richard Nixon's rapprochement visit to China in February 1972 and his talks with Mao Zedong that led to a period of détente between the two nations. A regular recurring character in the show's first four seasons, Wo Fat's appearances after the historic event became far more sporadic: just five episodes in eight years.

Appearances
Hawaii Five-O: 
 (September 20, 1968) (TV-movie pilot, re-edited into two-parter "Cocoon" for series reruns)
"Forty Feet High and It Kills!" (October 8, 1969) 
"A Bullet for McGarrett" (October 29, 1969) 
"And a Time to Die..." (September 16, 1970) 
"F.O.B. Honolulu: Part 1" (January 27, 1971) 
"F.O.B. Honolulu: Part 2" (February 3, 1971) 
"The Ninety-Second War: Part 1" (January 18, 1972) 
"The Ninety-Second War: Part 2" (January 25, 1972) 
"The Jinn Who Clears the Way" (October 10, 1972) 
"Presenting... in the Center Ring... Murder" (December 10, 1974) 
"Murder - Eyes Only" (September 12, 1975) (two-hour special, two-parter in reruns)
"Nine Dragons" (September 30, 1976) (two-hour special, two-parter in reruns)
"Woe to Wo Fat" (April 5, 1980)

Reboot: Hawaii Five-0 (2010–2020)

On November 2, 2010, CBS announced that Mark Dacascos was cast to fill the role of Wo Fat in the 2010 re-imagining of Hawaii Five-0.<ref>{{cite web|url= http://www.cbs.com/forum/posts/list/137228.page|title= Dancing' Iron Chef Chairman Mark Dacascos to Guest Star! | work=CBS | date=2 November 2010 | access-date=2010-11-02}}</ref> Like the original Wo Fat, Dacascos's character is depicted as criminal and a former agent of the Chinese government (specifically the Ministry of State Security).

Storylines
Wo Fat debuted in the last scene of the first-season episode "Hana 'a'a Makehewa" on December 13, 2010. In the episode, Wo Fat pays Victor Hesse a visit in jail and asks about Steve McGarrett's (Alex O'Loughlin) pursuit of justice for his father John (William Sadler), whom Hesse killed in the pilot episode. Over the course of the season, Wo Fat attracts McGarrett's attention because of his association with local Yakuza boss Hiro Noshimuri. It is revealed that Wo Fat ordered the death of the elder McGarrett and frames Steve in the season finale for killing Governor Jameson (who was in collusion with him).

As the second season begins, Wo Fat orders Hesse to kill McGarrett behind bars and kills Hesse to prevent Five-0 from getting more answers about him. He is also in cahoots with ex–CIA analyst Jenna Kaye, whose fiancé was captured in an earlier mission to take down Wo Fat. This allows him to manipulate Kaye in getting Steve's help for a fake ransom exchange in North Korea. He kills her and disappears as Five-0 rescues Steve. It is revealed that Wo Fat is obsessed with finding and killing a person named "Shelburne", who apparently killed his father years before the series. As Wo Fat hides in Osaka, late in the season, McGarrett captures him and brings him back to Hawaii. However, both men are forced to work together in fighting off Hiro's son and successor Adam, who was seeking revenge for his father's death. McGarrett locks him up at the Halawa Correctional Facility at the end of the season.

As the third season begins, "In La O Na Makuahine", Wo Fat is on the verge of being transferred but the prison truck he is in is attacked. The truck is then transported by a helicopter and dropped into the ocean. Armed men in SCUBA cut through the truck's secure door with torches and kill the guards, resulting in Fat being freed. It is later revealed that Frank Delano is the man responsible for attacking the truck and breaking Wo Fat out. The two strike up a deal; Delano will be able to get stolen drugs off the island in exchange for giving Wo Fat the location of Shelburne, who happens to be Doris McGarrett, Steve's supposedly dead mother. Wo Fat eventually confronts Doris in Steve's home and the two engage in a stand-off, holding each other at gunpoint. However, Doris fires three shots into the ground, giving Wo Fat time to escape although it's not known the extent of the relationship Doris has with Wo Fat. In "Hana I Wa 'I", Wo Fat kidnaps a congressman and is about to kill him until a helicopter manned by Steve with Danny firing arrives on scene. Wo Fat exchanges gunfire with Danny before fleeing yet again. In "Imi Loko Ka 'Uhane", Wo Fat returns, disguised as a police officer, and when reporter Savannah Walker interviews him during the show she videotaped about Five-0, McGarrett notices Wo Fat and started to shoot him but he got away. Later in the episode, Five-0 tracks him to the jungle where he gets severely injured when the helicopter he tries to escape in gets shot down. McGarrett refuses to kill him and instead sends him to the hospital with police guarding the hospital, where he is bandaged and handcuffed to the bed. In "Aloha, Malama Pono", Wo Fat is seen lying in a bed in a high risk detention facility at an unknown location with Steve standing in the room, staring at him. At the end of the episode, McGarrett pays him another visit and wants to know why his mother came to see him. Wo Fat agrees to tell him, but first McGarrett has to get Fat out of the jail. Then they both hear an explosion. Fat tells Steve that he is his protection because the unknown forces currently breaking down the door are not here to rescue him, but want him dead.

As the fourth season begins, "In Aloha kekahi i kekahi", NLM terrorists attempt to kill Wo Fat but McGarrett saves him. Before Wo Fat is transferred to a Supermax facility in Colorado, McGarrett wants an answer from Wo Fat why Doris visited him. Fat says she wanted to apologize to him for killing his father. In "O ka Pili'Ohana ka 'Oi", he is given medication in his solitary confinement cell by an officer for his heart condition. He is asked to swallow the medication and open his mouth so that it is certain he ingested it. Wo Fat hides the pills well in his mouth and reaches inside his toilet to reveal that this is not the first time he has faked it. He then uses the medication along with paint thinner and fertilizer from the jail, to craft an explosion to take out a wall in his cell to escape. He is positively ID'd at a gas station near Colorado Springs, pouring gasoline on someone, lighting them on fire, then stealing their truck to head back to Oahu.  After Grover's daughter Samantha is freed from Ian Wright's capture, she tells everyone that a man, revealed to be Wo Fat, killed Ian and released her. McGarrett is given a message from Samantha that Wo Fat will see him soon.

In the 100th episode, "Ina Paha", Wo Fat abducts Steve and tortures him in order to try to learn where he believes the U.S. government is holding his father. During the torture, he tells Steve that Doris had adopted him from the streets after her op went bad and his mother was killed. Doris raised him for some time before she was forced by the CIA to abandon him. After a long fight, Steve kills Wo Fat. His last words were, "You're not going to kill me. Are you... Brother?"

Appearances
"Hana ʻaʻa Makehewa" - Season 1, Episode 12 (December 13, 2010)
"Ke Kinohi" - Season 1, Episode 13 (January 3, 2011)
"Ne Meʻe Laua Na Paio" - Season 1, Episode 19 (March 21, 2011)
"Oia'i'o" - Season 1, Episode 24 (May 16, 2011)
"Haʻiʻole" - Season 2, Episode 1 (September 19, 2011)
"Ka Hakaka Maika'i" - Season 2, Episode 6 (October 24, 2011)
"Kiʻilua" - Season 2, Episode 10 (November 21, 2011)
"Ua Hopu" - Season 2, Episode 22 (May 7, 2012)
"La O Na Makuahine" - Season 3, Episode 1 (September 24, 2012)
"Hana I WaʻIa" - Season 3, Episode 14 (January 21, 2013)
"Imi Loko Ka ʻUhane" - Season 3, Episode 21 (April 29, 2013)
"Aloha, Malama Pono" - Season 3, Episode 24 (May 20, 2013)
"Aloha Ke Kahi I Ke Kahi" - Season 4, Episode 1 (September 27, 2013)
"O ka PiliʻOhana ka ʻOi" - Season 4, Episode 22 (May 9, 2014)
"Ina Paha" - Season 5, Episode 7 (November 7, 2014)
"Ka ʻōwili ʻōka’i" - Season 9, Episode 1 (September 28, 2018) 
"Aloha" - Season 10, Episode 22 (April 3, 2020)

In popular culture
Several seasons of the 1990s police drama Homicide: Life on the Street featured a recurring drug lord named Luther Mahoney whose gang always seem to escape the blame for the murders they cause. In the DVD commentary for that series, producers explained that Mahoney was largely based on Wo Fat.

References

External links
 
 Hawaii 5-O fan site
 Hawaii 5-O episode guide

Television characters introduced in 1968
Fictional Chinese secret agents
Fictional gangsters
Fictional murderers
Hawaii Five-O characters